The 2010–11 FIBA Americas League was the fourth edition of the first-tier and most important professional international club basketball competition in the regions of South America, Central America, the Caribbean, and Mexico, with the winner of the competition being crowned as the best team and champion of all of those regions. It was played between December 9, 2010 and March 6, 2011. The Argentine League club Peñarol de Mar del Plata, was the defending champion. Regatas Corrientes, also from Argentina, won the title.

Group stage

Group A

Group B

Group C

Group D

Quarterfinals stage

Group E

Group F

Final 4

Game 1

Game 2

Game 3

External links
FIBA Americas League 
FIBA Americas League 
FIBA Americas  
FIBA Liga Americas Twitter 
LatinBasket.com FIBA Americas League 
Liga de las Américas YouTube Channel 

2010–11
2010–11 in South American basketball
2010–11 in North American basketball